An urban area in Finland is defined as a cluster of dwellings with at least 200 inhabitants. The Finnish term for this is a taajama. Because of the strict definition of a taajama, these areas exist both inside and outside of city and municipal borders.

The largest taajama in Finland is the Helsinki urban area with over 1.3 million inhabitants in 2019. It extends across Helsinki as well as ten other municipalities in the Greater Helsinki area. The second largest is the Tampere urban area with about 342,000 inhabitants in 2019,  and the third largest is the Turku urban area with about 278,000 inhabitants in 2019. 

The presence of taajama areas is used to regulate traffic, with a default of  speed limit inside a taajama and  outside. Each major road leading in or out of a taajama is marked with a road sign.

See also 

List of urban areas in Finland by population
List of cities and towns in Finland
Urban areas in the Nordic countries
Dispersed settlement

References 

Types of administrative division
Geography of Finland
Finland